Live is the first live album by Pittsburgh rock band the Clarks, released in 1998.

Track listing 
 "Mercury"
 "Brand New"
 "Over Me"
 "Now and Then"
 "Penny on the Floor"
 "If I Can't Have You"
 "Courtney"
 "Help Me Out"
 "Apartment Song"
 "Lock and Key"
 "Caroline"
 "Cigarette"
 "Kiss"
 "Last Call"

Personnel 
 Scott Blasey - lead vocals, electric & acoustic guitars
 Rob James - electric & acoustic guitars, vocals
 Greg Joseph - bass guitar, vocals
 Dave Minarik - drums, vocals

The Clarks albums
1998 live albums